San Tomas Aquinas Creek, known locally as San Tomas Aquino Creek, is a  stream that heads on El Sereno mountain in El Sereno Open Space Preserve in Saratoga, California in Santa Clara County, California, United States. It flows north through the cities of Saratoga, Monte Sereno, Los Gatos, Campbell, Santa Clara and San Jose before its confluence with the Guadalupe Slough in south San Francisco Bay.

History
In the 1850s the creek appeared on several land grant maps as San Tomas Aquinas Creek and Arroyo de San Tomás Aquinas. Historically, San Tomas Aquino Creek formed the eastern boundary of the 1841 Rancho Quito and the western boundary of the 1840 Rancho Rinconada de Los Gatos land grants.

Watershed and course
The San Tomas Aquinas Creek watershed drains 44.8 square miles. The major tributaries of San Tomas Aquino Creek include (heading downstream) Mistletoe, Wildcat (and its Vasona sub-tributary), Smith and Saratoga Creeks. Smith Creek is a headwaters tributary of San Tomas Aquinas Creek, but is largely dry except during the winter months. It begins in the foothills of the Santa Cruz Mountains within the city of Monte Sereno, then flows northerly through portions of Los Gatos and Campbell until its confluence with San Tomas Aquino Creek. Saratoga Creek is the largest tributary and joins San Tomas Aquino Creek south of Highway 101, near Monroe Street.  Due to its relatively large size, the Saratoga Creek subwatershed is often viewed as a distinct watershed even though it does not directly discharge to the Lower South San Francisco Bay.  In fact, San Tomas Aquino Creek historically used to be a tributary of Saratoga Creek and thence to the Guadalupe River, but when the latter was redirected from Guadalupe Slough to Alviso Slough to facilitate navigation, San Tomas Aquino Creek was extended directly to Guadalupe Slough at Sunnyvale Baylands Park in Sunnyvale and Saratoga Creek became tributary to San Tomas Aquino Creek. The Guadalupe Slough carries the flows of San Thomas Aquino, Calabazas, and Saratoga Creeks out into south San Francisco Bay, passing just to the east of the Sunnyvale Water Pollution Control Ponds.

Vasona Creek is a short creek that runs through West Valley College and joins Wildcat Creek just before the latter reaches San Tomas Aquino Creek. With $570,000 in grants from the Santa Clara Valley Water District, the one mile section of Vasona Creek running through the college campus has undergone restoration since 2011, repairing deep channel incision and restoring riparian vegetation.

The middle portion of the creek runs under or alongside San Tomas Expressway.  At Cabrillo avenue it starts running under the median of the expressway until Williams Road.  Some portions are partially exposed, but much is completely underground.  From Williams road it runs along the west side of the expressway until Bucknall road.  From there it leaves the expressway and enters the hills.

The San Tomas Aquino bicycle and pedestrian trail follows the creek from the bay to Homestead road.

Habitat and wildlife
In 1898 John Otterbein Snyder collected steelhead trout (then Salmo irideus Gibbons) specimens in Campbell Creek (now Saratoga Creek, a tributary of San Tomas Aquino Creek). A 1985 California Department of Fish and Game (CDFG) survey of Saratoga Creek noted "a major steelhead and king salmon spawning area" on San Tomas Aquino Creek located approximately 200 yards downstream of the Saratoga and San Tomas Aquino creeks confluence. Stream resident coastal rainbow trout (Oncorhynchus mykiss irideus) persist in the Saratoga Creek watershed but anadromous steelhead cannot run up from the Bay because of a barrier at the confluence of San Tomas Aquino Creek and Saratoga Creek that prevents their passage upstream. Recent genetic analysis has shown that the San Tomas Aquino watershed trout are of native origin and not hatchery stock.

Leidy (2007) identified the native fishes in San Tomas Aquino Creek as Hitch (Lavinia exilicauda), California roach (Lavinia symmetricus), Sacramento sucker (Catostomus occidentalis occidentalis), Three-spined stickleback (Gasterosteus aculeatus), rainbow trout (Oncohrynchus mykiss irideus) and possibly Chinook salmon (Oncorhynchus tshawytscha). Although the latter had been considered now absent from the watershed, in mid-October, 1996, Roger Castillo, the founder of the Salmon and Steelhead Restoration Group, recovered a giant Chinook salmon from San Tomas Aquino Creek beneath Highway 237 (see photo). Non-native fishes include Common carp (Cyprinus carpio), Goldfish (Carassius auratus auratus), Golden shiner (Notemigonus crysoleucas), and Western mosquitofish (Gambusia affinis).

See also
List of watercourses in the San Francisco Bay Area

References

External links
 Guadalupe Slough Watershed maps page at Guide to San Francisco Bay Area Creeks
 Santa Clara County Creeks Coalition
 Santa Clara Basin Watershed Management Initiative (SCBWMI)
 Salmon and Steelhead Restoration Group

Rivers of Santa Clara County, California
Rivers of Northern California
Tributaries of San Francisco Bay